The 1989–90 FIBA European Cup Winners' Cup was the twenty-fourth edition of FIBA's 2nd-tier level European-wide professional club basketball competition, contested between national domestic cup champions, running from 26 September 1989, to 13 March 1990. It was contested by 21 teams, the same number of teams as the previous edition.

Knorr Bologna defeated Real Madrid, in the final that was held in Florence, winning its first European-wide title. It had previously lost the 1977–78 final against Gabetti Cantù.

Participants

First round

|}

Second round

|}

Quarterfinals

Semifinals

|}

Final
March 13, PalaGiglio, Florence

|}

References

External links
1989–90 FIBA European Cup Winner's Cup @ linguasport.com
FIBA European Cup Winner's Cup 1989–90

FIBA
FIBA Saporta Cup